{{Infobox election
| election_name      = 2020 New Hampshire Executive Council elections
| country            = New Hampshire
| type               = legislative
| ongoing            = no
| previous_election  = 2018 New Hampshire Executive Council election
| previous_year      = 2018
| next_election      = 2022 New Hampshire Executive Council election
| next_year          = 2022
| seats_for_election = All 5 seats on the Executive Council of New Hampshire
| election_date      = 
| party1             = Republican Party (United States)
| last_election1     = 2 seats
| seats_before1      = 2
| seats_after1       = 4
| seats1             = 
| seat_change1       =  2
| popular_vote1      = 398,757
| percentage1        = 51.99%
| swing1             =  5.27%
| party2             = Democratic Party (United States)
| last_election2     = 3 seats
| seats_before2      = 3| seats_after2       = 1
| seats2             = 
| seat_change2       =  2
| popular_vote2      = 368,190
| percentage2        = 48.01%
| swing2             =  2.89%
| map_image          = File:2020 New Hampshire Executive Council elections - Results by district.svg
| map_size           = 150px
| map_caption        = Results of the elections: 
}}

The 2020 New Hampshire Executive Council elections''' took place on Tuesday, November 3, 2020, to elect all five members of the Executive Council of New Hampshire. The party primaries were held on September 8.

Overview of results

District 1
District 1 covered all of Coos, Carroll, and Grafton counties, plus the municipalities of Alton, Center Harbor, Gilford, Laconia, Meredith, New Hampton, Sanbornton, Tilton in Belknap County, the towns of Andover, Danbury, Hill, New London, and Wilmot in Merrimack County, the towns of Middleton, Milton, and New Durham in Strafford County, and the municipalities of Claremont, Cornish, Croydon, Grantham, Newport, Plainfield, Springfield, and Sunapee in Sullivan County.

General election

District 2
District 2 covered the towns of Barnstead, Belmont, and Gilmanton in Belknap County, the municipalities of Alstead, Chesterfield, Dublin, Gilsum, Harrisville, Hinsdale, Keene, Marlborough, Marlow, Nelson, Roxbury, Stoddard, Sullivan, Surry, Walpole, Westmoreland, and Winchester in Cheshire County, the town of Hancock in Hillsborough County, the municipalities of Boscawen, Bradford, Canterbury, Concord, Franklin, Henniker, Hopkinton, Newbury, Northfield, Salisbury, Sutton, Warner, and Webster in Merrimack County, the municipalities of Dover, Durham, Farmington, Madbury, Rochester, Rollinsford, Somersworth, and Strafford in Strafford County, and the towns of Acworth, Charlestown, Goshen, Langdon, Lempster, Unity, and Washington in Sullivan County.

General election

District 3
District 3 covered the municipalities of Atkinson, Brentwood, Chester, Danville, Derry, East Kingston, Epping, Exeter, Fremont, Greenland, Hampstead, Hampton, Hampton Falls, Kensington, Kingston, New Castle, Newfields, Newington, Newmarket, Newton, North Hampton, Plaistow, Portsmouth, Raymond, Rye, Salem, Sandown, Seabrook, South Hampton, Stratham, and Windham in Rockingham County, and the town of Pelham in Hillsborough County.

General election

District 4
District 4 covered the municipalities of Bedford, Goffstown, and Manchester Hillsborough County, the towns of Allenstown, Bow, Chichester, Epsom, Hooksett, Loudon, Pembroke, and Pittsfield in Merrimack County, the towns of Auburn, Candia, Deerfield, Londonderry, Northwood, and Nottingham in Rockingham County, and the towns of Barrington and Lee in Strafford County.

General election

District 5
District 5 covered the towns of Fitzwilliam, Jaffrey, Richmond, Rindge, Swanzey, and Troy in Cheshire County, the town of Dunbarton in Merrimack County, and the municipalities of Amherst, Antrim, Bennington, Brookline, Deering, Francestown, Greenfield, Greenville, Hillsborough, Hollis, Hudson, Litchfield, Lyndeborough, Mason, Merrimack, Milford, Mont Vernon, Nashua, New Boston, New Ipswich, Peterborough, Sharon, Temple, Weare, Wilton, and Windsor in Hillsborough County.

General election

See also
 2020 New Hampshire elections
 2020 United States presidential election in New Hampshire
 2020 New Hampshire gubernatorial election
 2020 United States Senate election in New Hampshire
 2020 United States House of Representatives elections in New Hampshire

References 

Executive Council
2020
New Hampshire Executive Council